The 1952 San Francisco State Gators football team represented San Francisco State College—now known as San Francisco State University—as a member of the Far Western Conference (FWC) during the 1952 college football season. Led by third-year head coach Joe Verducci, San Francisco State compiled an overall record of 4–5 with  a mark of 1–0 in conference play, placing third in the FWC. For the season the team was outscored by its opponents 219 to 211. The Gators played home games at Cox Stadium in San Francisco.

With the forfeit, San Francisco State's overall record fell to 3–6.

Schedule

References

San Francisco State
San Francisco State Gators football seasons
San Francisco State Gators football